Miss International 1990, the 30th anniversary of the Miss International pageant, was held on 16 September 1990 at Osaka's Flower Expo Site. The pageant was hosted by Masumi Okada and the pageant won by Silvia de Esteban Niubo of Spain.

Results

Placements

Contestants

  - Vanessa Mirna Razzore Oyola
  - Anna Stokes
  - Sandra Luttenburger
  - Katia Alens
  - Giselle Greminger
  - Ivana Carla Hubsch
  - Jane Lloyd
  - Lee Ann Bruce
  - Elsa Victoria Rivera Botero
  - Andrea Murillo Fallas
  - Ingrid Ondrovicova
  - Pernille Wiered
  - Vivian Aelin Calderón
  - Anu Yli-Mäenpää
  - Celine Marteau
  - Ilka Endres
  - Irini Stefanou
  - Cassandra Lynn Calvo
  - Marianella Amelia Abate
  - Nadine Atangan Tanega
  - Esther Wilhelmina Johanna den Otter
  - Claudia Mercedes Caballero
  - Helen Yung Hang-Lan
  - Thordis Steinunn Steinsdóttir
  - Veronika Mary Moore
  - Ravit Lichtenberg
  - Silvia Paci
  - Hiroko Ohnishi
  - Shin Soh-young
  - Bea Jarzynska
  - Elizabeth Cavazos Leal
  - Tania Elizabeth Marsh
  - Regina Imaobong Askia Usoro
  - Edwina Taitano Menzies
  - Hanne Thorsdalen
  - Angela Patricia Vergara
  - Jennifer "Jenny" Perez Pingree
  - Ewa Maria Szymczak
  - Maria José dos Santos Cardoso
  - Ana Rosa Brito Suárez
  - Genni Wan Wong Yi
  - Silvia de Estaban Niubó
  - Desana Danika Dedigama
  - Monika Halina Andersson
  - Rosemarie Roswitha Naef
  - Laksamee Tienkantade
  - Aylin Fatma Aydin
  - Shawna Lea Bowman
  USSR - Irina Vassilenko
  - Vanessa Holler

Crossovers
Contestants who competed in other beauty pageants:
Miss World America
1992: : Nadine Atangan Tanega (3rd Runner-Up)

Miss USA
1994: : Nadine Atangan Tanega (Top 12)

1990
1990 in Japan
1990 beauty pageants
Beauty pageants in Japan